Moreau Lake is a lake that is located west of Fortsville, New York. Fish species present in the lake are rainbow trout, pickerel, smallmouth bass, largemouth bass, yellow perch, pumpkinseed sunfish, and brown bullhead. There is a boat rental place on the lake. There is a state owned boat launch and carry down in Moreau Lake State Park. No motors are allowed on this lake.

References

Lakes of New York (state)
Lakes of Saratoga County, New York